Ze'ev Wolf ben David ha-Kohen Buchner (1750–1820), also known as the Razbad, was a Galician Hebrew-language grammarian and poet, considered a forerunner of the Haskalah movement.

Though he lived most of his life in Brody, he traveled with Hebrew books through Germany, Galicia, Poland, and Lithuania, at times earning his livelihood by writing letters for illiterate people. His own publications were another source of income to him. He suffered very much in his travels through foreign countries, and in Berlin he sustained an injury which cost him the sight of his right eye.

Work
His works include Zeved ha-Melitzah (1774), an imitation of Yehuda Alharizi's Takhemoni; Zeved Tov (1794), a collection of poems; Keter Malkhut (Lemberg, 1794), a hymn in the style of Ibn Gabirol's work of the same name; Shire Tehillah (Berlin, 1797), hymns and parodies; and Tzaḥut ha-Melitzah (Prague, 1805), a collection of his private letters. The Shir Nifla (Frankfurt an der Oder, 1802) and Shir Yedidut (Frankfurt an der Oder, 1810) are partial reprints from the Shire Tehillah. His parodies of the marriage and betrothal contracts were later abridged and published separately as Seder Tenaim Rishonim me-Ḥag ha-Pesaḥ (Lemberg, 1878), and wrongly ascribed to Israel Najara.

About his poetry the Jewish Encyclopedia writes:

See also
Zev Wolf (disambiguation page)

References

External links
 Works by Ze'ev Wolf Buchner at the Online Books Page

1750 births
1820 deaths
People from Brody
Hebrew-language poets
Grammarians of Hebrew
18th-century letter writers
19th-century letter writers